Ng Tze Yong (born on 16 May 2000) is a Malaysian badminton player. Ng won a bronze medal in the 2021 Sudirman Cup. He also helped his team to win gold at the Badminton Asia Team Championships and 2022 Commonwealth Games.

Early life and background
Ng was born in Johor Bahru to Angela Tan and badminton coach, Wilson Ng Soon Tuan. He is the eldest of three siblings. He started to take interest in  badminton at the age of four after watching a local badminton match.

Career
Ng won a bronze medal in the 2017 Asian Junior Championships boys' doubles event with Chia Wei Jie.

Ng was among the players that won a silver at the 2017 BWF World Junior Championships mixed team and in the 2020 Badminton Asia Team Championships men's team. He won four grade 3 international challenge titles through the Polish Open, South Australia International, Belgian International and Scottish Open. Ng also competed in the 2020 Thomas Cup.

In 2022, Ng competed in the India Open and lost in the semifinals to Lakshya Sen in three games. He later competed in the Badminton Asia Team Championships and delivered the point that won the Malaysian team gold when he defeated Ikhsan Rumbay of Indonesia.

Ng was chosen to represent the national team in the 2022 Commonwealth Games in Birmingham, replacing Lee Zii Jia who opted to skip the games. He beat Srikanth Kidambi to score a crucial point for Malaysia which eventually lead to Malaysia winning gold at the mixed team event.

Achievements

Commonwealth Games
Men's singles

Asian Junior Championships 
Boys' doubles

BWF International Challenge/Series (5 titles, 1 runner-up) 
Men's singles

  BWF International Challenge tournament
  BWF International Series tournament
  BWF Future Series tournament

Record against selected opponents 
Record against year-end Finals finalists, World Championships semi-finalists, and Olympic quarter-finalists. Accurate as of 7 September 2022.

References

External links 
 

2000 births
Living people
People from Johor
Malaysian male badminton players
Malaysian sportspeople of Chinese descent
Badminton players at the 2022 Commonwealth Games
Commonwealth Games gold medallists for Malaysia
Commonwealth Games silver medallists for Malaysia
Commonwealth Games medallists in badminton
21st-century Malaysian people
Medallists at the 2022 Commonwealth Games